Darunavir/cobicistat, sold under the brand names Prezcobix (US) and Rezolsta (EU), is a fixed-dose combination antiretroviral medication used to treat and prevent HIV/AIDS. It contains darunavir and cobicistat. Darunavir is an HIV protease inhibitor and cobicistat increases the effectiveness of darunavir by blocking its metabolism by the enzyme CYP3A.

Darunavir/cobicistat was approved for use in the European Union in November 2014, and for use in the United States in January 2015.

References

External links
 
 
 

Antiretroviral drugs
CYP3A4 inhibitors
Fixed dose combination (antiretroviral)